The Iran national women's cricket team is the team that represents the country of Iran in international women's cricket matches. They made their international debut when they played at the 2009 ACC Women's Twenty20 Championship, losing to Nepal in July 2009, since then took part in the 2013 ACC Women's Championship, and then the 2014 ACC Women's Premier.

In April 2018, the International Cricket Council (ICC) granted full Women's Twenty20 International (WT20I) status to all its members. Therefore, all Twenty20 matches played between Iran women and another international side after 1 July 2018 will be a full WT20I.

Tournament history

Head coaches

 Shamsa Hashmi 2008-2009
 Hajira Sarwar 2010-2013
 Mozhdeh Bavandpour 2014

Captains

Nahid Hakimian 2009
Somayyeh Sahrapour 2013
Nasimeh Rahshetaei 2014

Awards
2012 	Monir Habibi, Volunteer of the Year, Pepsi ICC Development Programme Awards
2013 	Winners, Spirit of Cricket Award ACC Women’s Championship

Limited-overs head-to-head

Updated until last match played:  17 February 2014
The result percentage excludes no results and counts ties as half a win

Twenty20 head-to-head

Updated until last match played:  10 July 2009
The result percentage excludes no results and counts ties as half a win

See also
 Iran national cricket team

References

External links
 Iranian Cricket Association.

Cricket
Iran in international cricket
Women's national cricket teams
Cricket in Iran